Sungai Udang Recreational Forest is a lowland dipterocarp forest in Sungai Udang, Malacca, Malaysia under the management of the State Forestry Department. It was declared a reserved area in 1987 with an area of 55 hectares.

See also
 Geography of Malaysia
 List of tourist attractions in Malacca

References

Central Melaka District
Forests of Malaysia
Tourist attractions in Malacca